Chahar Qaleh is a village in West Azerbaijan Province, Iran.

Chahar Qaleh and Chehar Qaleh may also refer to:

Chahar Qaleh-ye Barani
Chahar Qaleh-ye Olya
Chahar Qaleh-ye Sadat
Chahar Qaleh-ye Sofla
Chahar Qaleh-ye Vosta